Kankana Banerjee (born April 19, 1946) is an Indian Classical singer who trained under the tutelage of Indian classical vocalist Ustad Amir Khan in Lucknow. She has received several accolades and awards for her contribution to Hindustani classical music, including the State Government of Andhra Pradesh felicitation "Andhra Ratna Award (Kala Saraswati)" presented by Mother Teresa in 1987.

Biography 
She was born in Bengali, to an affluent family in the city of Calcutta. Her mother, Mandira Chatterjee, was a disciple of Tarapada Chakraborty of Kolkata and Shrikrishna Narayan Ratanjankar of Lucknow. Her grandfather was Radha Kamal Mukherjee, sociologist and former Vice-Chancellor of the University of Lucknow.
Kankana Banerjee began Hindustani Classical music training early in her career under the influence and supervision of her mother. In 1955, she began training under Ustad Amir Khan, who hailed from the Indore Gharana. She gave her first public performance at the age of fourteen in the year 1960.

Career 
She performed the Darbari Kanara 'Tarana' created by  Ustad Amir khan in the style of Amir Khusrau (HMV studio, Bombay). The track was published by HMV on a special record ‘Multifaceted genius of Amir Khusrau’. It was released to commemorate the 7th Centenary celebrations of the poet.

Kankana Banerjee became a disciple of  Pandit Pratap Narain who belonged to the Mewati Gharana. She has received numerous accolades during her career including the "Kala Saraswati Andhra Ratna Award" from the Government of Andhra Pradesh, presented to her by Mother Teresa.

She has also worked as a playback singer, recording songs based on classical ragas for the films Ram Teri Ganga Maili and Id Mubaraq.

Marriage and children 
Kankana Banerjee married Sunil Kumar Banerjee, another disciple of Ustad Amir Khan, at the age of 17. Together they had two children, a daughter and a son. Shortly after the birth of their son, when Kankana Banerjee 21, her husband passed away. Kankana Banerjee never remarried.

Honours, decorations, awards and distinctions

References

External links
 http://www.hindustaniclassical.com/schedule/ahobal
 https://vdocuments.mx/ustad-ameer-khan.html
 https://www.delhievents.com/2018/03/music-sangeet-natak-akademi-raag-dopahri-kathak-kendra.html
 http://www.tribuneindia.com/2005/20051231/cth2.htm
 http://www.varanasitourismtravels.com/events/sankat-mochan-music-festival/#.WvRUX6SFPIU

Hindustani musicians
1946 births
Living people
20th-century Khyal singers
Women musicians from West Bengal